Ope Peleseuma (born 11 February 1992) is a rugby union footballer who plays as a midfielder for  in the ITM Cup.   His performances at domestic level were rewarded when he was named in the  Wider Training Squad for the 2013 Super Rugby season.

Peleseuma represented New Zealand Under 20 in the 2012 IRB Junior World Championship in South Africa.

References

External links
 Ope Peleseuma itsrugby.co.uk Player Statistics

Living people
New Zealand rugby union players
Wellington rugby union players
Hurricanes (rugby union) players
Taranaki rugby union players
1992 births
Rugby union centres
Sportspeople from Apia
Samoan emigrants to New Zealand
Samoa international rugby union players